All Saints' Church on Little Gibbs Road in Malabar Hill, Mumbai, India is affiliated to the Church of North India. It was built in 1881 as an Anglican church for the local congregation that had to earlier travel some 8 kilometres to St. Thomas Cathedral in Fort. It was designed by Major Mant of the Royal Engineers, and the foundation stone was laid by Lady Ferguson, wife of Sir James Fergusson, 6th Baronet, the then Governor of Bombay. It was consecrated on 16 January 1882.

The church has a semi-circular chancel and the facade is made out of Porbandar stone. It had a wooden belfry tower that was removed in 1951 when it was damaged in a cyclone.

Bibliography

References

External links
The Bombay Diocesan Trust Association - All Saints' Church, Malabar Hill

Churches in Mumbai
Church of North India church buildings
Churches in Maharashtra
1881 establishments in India
Gothic Revival church buildings in India
Churches completed in 1881
19th-century churches in India